Thomas Gape may refer to:
 Thomas Gape (Great Bedwyn MP), member of parliament for Great Bedwyn, 1660 
 Thomas Gape (St Albans MP), member of parliament for St Albans, 1730–1732